The ninth series of the BBC family sitcom My Family originally aired between 2 April 2009 and 24 December 2009. The series was commissioned following successful ratings from the previous series. The opening episode, "Bully For Ben", re-introduces the six main characters, with the exception of Abi. Kris Marshall (Nick) and Siobhan Hayes (Abi) make a guest appearance in the last episode of the series, "Kenzo's Project". All episodes from the ninth series are thirty minutes long, excluding the Christmas special. The eighth episode of the series, "The Guru", was announced as the 100th episode of the series, and included guest appearances from John Barrowman and David Haig. The series was once again produced by Rude Boy Productions, a company that produces comedies created by Fred Barron. The series was filmed at Pinewood Studios in London, in front of a live audience.

Episode Information

Reception

Viewers
The series was given a new, Thursday evening prime-time slot, with the opening episode airing at 8:30pm, with all the following episodes airing at 8:30. To celebrate the 100th episode of My Family, the fourth and fifth episodes were aired as a double-bill in a Sunday evening prime-time slot. The opening episode of the series gained 6.83 million viewers, a consistent improvement on series eight. The ninth series averaged 5.13 million viewers for each episode.

References

External links
My Family: Series Nine

2009 British television seasons